The 2003 Pendle Borough Council election took place on 1 May 2003 to elect members of Pendle Borough Council in Lancashire, England. One third of the council was up for election and the council stayed under no overall control.

After the election, the composition of the council was
Liberal Democrat 23
Labour 15
Conservative 11

Campaign
Before the election the council had 19 Labour, 19 Liberal Democrat and 11 Conservative councillors, with Labour holding power as a minority administration. 18 seats were being elected, with 2 seats contested in Boulsworth after the death of councillor Jo Belbin. In total 63 candidates stood, with only one sitting councillor, Abdul Jabbar in Brierfield, not standing for re-election. As well as candidates from the Conservative, Labour and Liberal Democrat parties, there were also 3 candidates from the Socialist Alliance, 4 independents and 4 from the British National Party. This was the first time the British National Party had put up candidates in Pendle.

Issues in the election included the proposed redevelopment of Nelson town centre, plans for an A56 bypass and the proposed demolition of houses in Nelson West. Other issues as usual were council tax levels, litter, street safety and crime, while the national issue of the Iraq War was expected to influence voters.

Election result
The results saw the Liberal Democrats become the largest party on the council, but without a majority, after making four gains from Labour. This took the Liberal Democrats to 23 seats, compared to 15 for Labour and 11 Conservatives, after the Liberal Democrats nearly won as many votes as the Conservative and Labour parties combined. The Labour leader of the council, Azhar Ali, was among the councillors to lose their seats in the election, which saw the party fail to win any seats. Ali blamed the defeats both on a backlash against the Iraq War and on an alleged "dirty tricks campaign". Meanwhile, the British National Party failed to win any seats, but did poll a significant number of votes.

Following the election many of the Liberal Democrat councillors boycotted the swearing in of a new mayor in protest against the way he was elected instead of the previous years deputy mayor. Liberal Democrat Alan Davies became the new leader of the council, but his party initially refused to take places on the executive committee. This was because the council had voted for a 4–3–3 party split on the committee rather than the 5–3–2 split the Liberal Democrats had proposed. Meanwhile, the Labour group chose Frank Clifford to become the new leader of their group.

Ward results

References

2003 English local elections
2003
2000s in Lancashire